Astashikha is a rural locality (a selo) in Alexeyevsky Selsoviet of Bureysky District, Amur Oblast, Russia. The population was 106 as of 2018. There are  4 streets.

Geography 
Astashikha is located 74 km southwest of Novobureysky (the district's administrative centre) by road. Alexeyevka is the nearest rural locality.

References 

Rural localities in Bureysky District